Noerdange is a small town in the commune of Beckerich, in western Luxembourg.  , the town has a population of 599.

References

Beckerich
Towns in Luxembourg